Mulalanka is a small village in the Kalidindi Mandal of Krishna District in Andhra Pradesh, India. Its name used to be Mulaupparagudam. It comes under the Kaikaluru assembly constituency and Eluru Parliamentary constituency. The people in mulalanka main occupation is fish and frawn culture. It was located in a corner to the krishna district, so the fresh water is very rare to use for farming purpose. So they mainly depends upon the salt water and this village is very famous for there aqua culture and export to various parts of country.

Demographics
Population
 Total: 4000
 Male: 2746
 Female: 1254
 Households: 2000

Literacy rates
 Total: 2037 (58.96%)
 Male: 2706 (63.06%)
 Female: 931 (54.82%)

Climate

The climate is tropical, with hot summers and moderate winters. The average warmest month is May. On average, the coolest month is January. The maximum average precipitation occurs in August. The peak temperature reaches 37 °C (99 °F) in May–June, while the winter temperature is 19-28 C. The average humidity is 78% and the average annual rainfall is 103 cm. Mulalanka gets its rainfall from both the south-west monsoon and north-east monsoon.

Villages in Krishna district